Marapong is a village in Central District of Botswana. It is located west of Francistown, to the south of the road connecting Francistown to Nata. The population was 2,666 in 2011 census.

References

Populated places in Central District (Botswana)
Villages in Botswana